Hemimastodon ("half mastodont") is an extinct genus of proboscidean from the Late Miocene deposits of the Dera Bugti Beds in Pakistan.

Its phylogenetic affinity within other proboscideans is uncertain.

References 

 Tassy, P. 1988. Le statut systématique de l’espèce Hemimastodon crepusculi (Pilgrim): L’éternal problème de l’homologie et de la convergence. Annales de Paléontologie 74: 115–127.

Elephantiformes
Miocene proboscideans
Miocene mammals of Asia
Prehistoric placental genera